H3, H03 or H-3 may refer to:

Entertainment 

 Happy Hustle High, a manga series by Rie Takada, originally titled "H3 School!"
 H3 (film), a 2001 film about the 1981 Irish hunger strike
 h3h3Productions, styled "[h3]", a satirical YouTube channel

Science 

 Triatomic hydrogen (H3), an unstable molecule
 Trihydrogen cation (H3+), one of the most abundant ions in the universe
 Tritium (Hydrogen-3, or H-3), an isotope of hydrogen
 ATC code H03 Thyroid therapy, a subgroup of the Anatomical Therapeutic Chemical Classification System
 British NVC community H3, a heath community of the British National Vegetation Classification system
 Histamine H3 receptor, a human gene
 Histone H3, a component of DNA higher structure in eukaryotic cells
 , one of the three laryngeals in the reconstructed Proto-Indo-European language
 Hekla 3 eruption, a huge volcanic eruption around 1000 BC

Computing 

 , the level-3 HTML heading markup element
 HTTP/3, the third revision of a protocol for the World Wide Web
 Socket H3, the common name of the LGA 1150 CPU socket

Transportation

Air and space
 H3 (rocket), an expendable launch system under development by Japan Aerospace Exploration Agency
 Harbour Air Seaplanes (IATA code), a Canadian charter airline
 H-3 Air Base, former Iraqi Air Force base in western Iraq
 H-3 Sea King, a United States Navy helicopter
 Standard H-3, an improved version of the 1916 Standard H-2 aircraft

Automobiles
 Brilliance H3, a Chinese compact sedan
 Haval H3, a Chinese compact SUV
 Huansu H3, a Chinese compact MPV
 Hummer H3, an American mid-size SUV

Ships
 USS H-3 (SS-30), a 1914 United States Navy H-class submarine
 HMS Grenville (H03), a 1935 British Royal Navy destroyer
 HMS H3, a 1915 British Royal Navy H-class submarine

Rail
 H3 series of METRORail tramways in Houston
 GNR Class H3, a class of British steam locomotives

Roads
 H3 Monks Way, a road part of the Milton Keynes grid road system, United Kingdom
 Interstate H-3, a highway in Hawaii

Other uses 
 H3 (classification), a para-cycling classification
 H3, an 18th-century marine chronometer by John Harrison
 H3, a type of automotive halogen lamp
 H3 (pyrotechnics), a pyrotechnic composition
 H3 Hardy Collaboration Architecture, a firm started by Hugh Hardy
 H3 Pharmaceutical Chemistry, an advanced subject for GCE A-level students in Singapore
 DSC-H3, a 2008 Sony Cyber-shot camera
 Hash House Harriers, an international group of non-competitive running, social and drinking clubs
H3 (Kuwait), an archaeological site

See also 

 3H (disambiguation)
 HHH (disambiguation)
 Triple H (disambiguation)